In organic chemistry, Wittig reagents are organophosphorus compounds of the formula R3P=CHR', where R is usually phenyl.  They are used to convert ketones and aldehydes to alkenes:

Preparation
Because they typically hydrolyze and oxidize readily, Wittig reagents are prepared using air-free techniques. They are typically generated and used in situ.  THF is a typical solvent. Some are sufficiently stable to be sold commercially.

Formation of phosphonium salt
Wittig reagents are usually prepared from a phosphonium salt, which is in turn prepared by the quaternization of triphenylphosphine with an alkyl halide. Wittig reagents are usually derived from a primary alkyl halide.  Quaternization of triphenylphosphine with secondary halides is typically inefficient. For this reason, Wittig reagents are rarely used to prepare tetrasubstituted alkenes.

Bases for deprotonation of phosphonium salts
The alkylphosphonium salt is deprotonated with a strong base such as n-butyllithium:
[Ph3P+CH2R]X− + C4H9Li → Ph3P=CHR + LiX + C4H10
Besides n-butyllithium (nBuLi), other strong bases like sodium and potassium t-butoxide (tBuONa, tBuOK), lithium, sodium and potassium hexamethyldisilazide (LiHMDS, NaHMDS, KHDMS, where HDMS = N(SiMe3)2), or sodium hydride (NaH) are also commonly used. For stabilized Wittig reagents bearing conjugated electron-withdrawing groups, even relatively weak bases like aqueous sodium hydroxide or potassium carbonate can be employed.

The identification of a suitable base is often an important step when optimizing a Wittig reaction.  Because phosphonium ylides are seldom isolated, the byproduct(s) generated upon deprotonation essentially plays the role of an additive in a Wittig reaction. As a result, the choice of base has a strong influence on the efficiency and, when applicable, the stereochemical outcome of the Wittig reaction.
Substituent effects
Electron-withdrawing groups (EWGs) enhance the ease of deprotonation of phosphonium salts. This behavior is illustrated by the finding that deprotonation of triphenylcarbethoxymethylphosphonium requires only sodium hydroxide. The resulting triphenylcarbethoxymethylenephosphorane is somewhat air-stable. It is however less reactive than ylides lacking EWGs. For example they usually fail to react with ketones, necessitating the use of the Horner–Wadsworth–Emmons reaction as an alternative. Such stabilized ylides usually give rise to an E-alkene product when they react, rather than the more usual Z-alkene.

Reactions
Olefination
Wittig reagents are used for olefination reactions, i.e. the Wittig reaction.

Protonation
Wittig reagents are prepared by deprotonation of alkyl phosphonium salts, and this reaction can be reversed.  The methodology can be useful in the preparation of unusual Wittig reagents.

Alkylation
Alkylation of Ph3P=CH2 with a primary alkyl halide R−CH2−X, produces substituted phosphonium salts:
Ph3P=CH2 + RCH2X → Ph3P+ CH2CH2R X−
These salts can be deprotonated in the usual way to give Ph3P=CH−CH2R.  
Deprotonation
Although ylides are "electron-rich", they are susceptible to deprotonation of alkyl substituents. Treatment of Me3PCH2 with butyl lithium affords Me2P(CH2)2Li. Having carbanion-like properties, lithiated ylides function as ligands. Thus Me2P(CH2)2Li is a potential bidentate ligand.

Examples
 (Chloromethylene)triphenylphosphorane
 Methoxymethylenetriphenylphosphorane
 Methylenetriphenylphosphorane
 Triphenylcarbethoxymethylenephosphorane
 Hexaphenylcarbodiphosphorane

Structure
Wittig reagents are usually described as a combination of two resonance structures:
Ph3P+CR2− ↔ Ph3P=CR2
The former is called the ylide form and the latter is called the phosphorane form, which is the more familiar representation.

Crystallographic characterization of methylenetriphenylphosphorane shows that the phosphorus atom is tetrahedral. The PCH2 centre is planar and the P=CH2 distance is 1.661 Å, which is much shorter than the other P-C distances (1.823 Å).

External links
Wittig reaction in Organic Syntheses, Coll. Vol. 10, p. 703 (2004); Vol. 75, p. 153 (1998). (Article)
Wittig reaction in Organic Syntheses, Coll. Vol. 5, p. 361 (1973); Vol. 45, p. 33 (1965). (Article)

References

organophosphorus compounds